HMS Princess Royal was a 90-gun second rate ship of the line of the Royal Navy, launched on 18 October 1773 at Portsmouth. During her career she was upgraded to a 98-gun ship, by the addition of eight 12 pdr guns to her quarterdeck.

May, 1778 under command of Capt. William Blair.

In 1795, Princess Royal took part in the Naval Battle of Genoa and the Naval Battle of Hyères Islands under Captain John Child Purvis.

She was broken up in 1807.

Citations and notes

References

Lavery, Brian (2003) The Ship of the Line - Volume 1: The development of the battlefleet 1650-1850. Conway Maritime Press. .

Ships of the line of the Royal Navy
Barfleur-class ships of the line
1773 ships